Wyrsch is a German language surname. Notable people with the name include:
 Alois Wyrsch (1825–1888), Swiss politician
 Charles Wyrsch (1920–2019), Swiss artist and painter
 Louis Wyrsch (1793–1858), Swiss politician and a military commander
 Melchior Wyrsch (1732–1798), Swiss painter

References 

Swiss-German surnames